For the 2009–10 season, 1. FC Union Berlin competed in the 2. Bundesliga.

Transfers

Summer transfers

In:

Out:

Winter transfers

In:

Out:

Players

Appearances and goals
Appearance and goalscoring records for all the players who are in the Union Berlin first team squad during the 2009–10 season.

|}

Match details

2. Bundesliga

Note: Results are given with Union Berlin score listed first.

League table

DFB-Pokal

Note: Results are given with Union Berlin score listed first.

References

1. FC Union Berlin seasons
Union Berlin